CoolSPICE is a computer aided design tool for electronic circuit development. It is a version of the SPICE (Simulation Program with Integrated Circuit Emphasis) simulation tool with focuses on design and simulation for circuit operation at cryogenic temperatures, circuits operating with Wide-bandgap semiconductors, and simulation of thermal effects on circuit performance.

Introduction/Overview 
The circuit simulation tool was developed from SPICE3f5, a version of Ngspice, by CoolCAD Electronics, LLC. It can model standard electronic applications including radio frequency and audio circuits but was created with a focus on modelling and designing circuits functioning at extreme temperatures ranging 4K to 300K. The software is used for modelling both cryogenic-temperature CMOS circuits and high-power, high-temperature Silicon carbide (SiC)-power Metal Oxide Semiconductor Field Effect Transistor (MOSFET) devices. It's also used to simulate the temperature change of various electrical components that result from power dissipation during circuit operation. A freeware version of CoolSPICE is available for download on the web.

Development and Capabilities

Cryogenic Electronics Simulation 
CoolSPICE simulates electronic circuits operating at cryogenic temperatures ranging as low as 4K which is the temperature of liquid Helium (He). The compact models used to carry out these circuit simulations were created for numerous CMOS processes; models were built on BSIM 4 and experimentally verified. BSIM 4 is a predictive MOSFET SPICE model for circuit simulation and CMOS development created by the BSIM Research Group in the Department of Electrical Engineering and Computer Sciences at the University of California, Berkeley. CoolSPICE also has device models for cryogenic temperature operation simulation of NMOS and PMOS from different technologies. The tool reads net-list files of other similar circuit simulation tools such as Cadence.

Silicon carbide Power MOSFET Device Simulation 
CoolSPICE has models for simulating Wide-bandgap semiconductor devices which includes power MOSFETs, SiC BJTs, and GaAs power FETs. The SPICE simulation models for SiC-power MOSFET devices for the software were developed using sub-circuits built around the standard BSIM MOSFET. Power devices have specific behaviors unique to themselves and certain BSIM equations have been modified in order to account for that factor. The drain-to-gate and drain-to-source capacitance terms were modified for the purpose of accounting the different structures of power MOSFET devices. Due to these various modifications, the new BSIM equations required the introduction of new parameters to the already existing MOSFET parameter sets. The resulting new models with both common BSIM parameters as well as the newly introduced parameters necessitated by the modifications are the models used by CoolSPICE for simulations.

Thermal Modeling 
CoolSPICE is used for performing thermal analysis of circuit operation. Due to Joule heating, electronic circuits generate heat and their components increase in temperature (fans are often used to help cool circuits under circumstances where temperature increase affects the electronics). The software is able to simulate these types of temperature increases. The heat transport mechanisms accounted for in these thermal calculations include conduction and convection. CoolSPICE contains a library for these thermal simulations.

References

Electronic circuit simulators